Charles Andrew Belmont Jr. (born November 20, 1957) is a retired stock car driver and team owner. Belmont began racing at an early age before moving south. In 1987, he was named the NASCAR Dash Series Rookie of the Year, then he won the championship the next year as a car owner. Belmont posted three wins in the DASH Series (currently known as ISCARS DASH Touring since 2005) at Hickory Motor Speedway on October 18, 1987, Myrtle Beach Speedway on May 20, 1988, and Southside Speedway on July 8, 1988.

Career overview
In 1989, Belmont made his Winston Cup debut at Dover Downs International Speedway (now Dover International) Peak Performance 500, starting 35th and finishing 29th after his No. 04 Winner Ford Cherry Hill Ford Thunderbird suffered braking failure. In 1992, he finished runner-up for Winston Cup Rookie of the Year despite running just eight races. His best NASCAR finish came in a Busch Series race in 1995 at Darlington Raceway.

Running in only five ARCA events in 1995, Andy earned three top five finishes. Three years later he became a regular competitor on the circuit, finishing the 1998 campaign in 5th place in the final point standings. He backed that up with a 6th-place finish in 1999. The following season resulted in another top ten finish in the final point standings.

Belmont finished in the top ten in ARCA points four years in a row.

Since 2000 he has run 174 races in the ARCA Re/MAX Series. He has not won yet, but has 54 top-ten finishes.

In 2006, Belmont attempted Cup racing again, entering a car in the Daytona 500 sponsored by Year One Muscle Cars and Fanscrew.com.

Ownership role
Belmont stepped out of the drivers seat and into an ownership role.  His team, Andy Belmont Racing,  was based in Lexington, NC, and ran two cars weekly in the ARCA Racing Series presented by Re/Max and Menards. Chad McCumbee last drove the No. 1 for ABR in 2011, winning the Bill France Four Crown tile with sponsorship from ModSpace.  McCumbee had previously won races for ABR. In 2007, McCumbee won two races in five starts for ABR, at the Nashville Superspeedway and Pocono Raceway. McCumbee was the winner of the 2011 Allen Crowe 100 at Springfield in 2011.
 
Mikey Kile was ABR's last driver of its ARCA entries in 2012.

Personal life
Belmont has 5 children and  sold the race team moving back to the Philadelphia area in 2012 to help run a family business. Two of the three boys work with Belmont to run the business on a daily basis.

Motorsports career results

NASCAR
(key) (Bold – Pole position awarded by qualifying time. Italics – Pole position earned by points standings or practice time. * – Most laps led.)

Nextel Cup Series

Daytona 500

Busch Series

Craftsman Truck Series

ARCA Re/Max Series
(key) (Bold – Pole position awarded by qualifying time. Italics – Pole position earned by points standings or practice time. * – Most laps led.)

Notes

External links
 
 
 

Living people
1957 births
People from Langhorne, Pennsylvania
Racing drivers from Pennsylvania
NASCAR drivers
ARCA Menards Series drivers
ISCARS Dash Touring Series drivers
NASCAR team owners